Expedition GeForce is a steel roller coaster located at Holiday Park in Haßloch, Germany. It is one of the largest roller coasters in Europe and has an 82 degree first drop.

Until the opening of Silver Star at Europa-Park, it was the tallest roller coaster operating on the European mainland.

Ride information

The ride opened on June 18, 2001 to celebrate the 30-year anniversary of Holiday Park's operation, costing approximately €10 million. It has a maximum throughput of 1,300 riders per hour, with two 28-seater trains in operation. The track rests on 209 foundations, which are up to 20 metres deep.

It was constructed by Swiss manufacturers Intamin, which markets this type of coaster as Mega Coaster, in collaboration with German engineer Werner Stengel. Unlike many other coasters, the ride does not employ a conventional chain lift but a faster cable lift with a catch car, very similar to the system used for Millennium Force.
It is one of the prebuilt rides in RollerCoaster Tycoon 3 and NoLimits.

Ride layout

From the station, the trains ascend the  lift hill and encounter the first drop, which at 82°, makes a 74° right-hand turn. The ride continues with several large hills, which give a sensation of air-time, especially in the rear of the trains, and a number of overbanked turns, before becoming more twisted as the ride runs through woods and over a lake. Just before entering the brake run, the trains negotiate a series of bunny hops, again giving riders considerable amounts of air-time.

Vehicles
The coaster has two trains of seven cars each. Each car seats two across in two rows. The trains are stainless steel with stadium-style seating. Each seat has an individual lap bar in addition to a seatbelt.

Incident
On April 28, 2010 a train full of passengers came to a sudden stop when one of the cars derailed just after completing the ride's first drop. Firefighters evacuated all riders. None were seriously injured.

Rankings

References

External links

 Holiday Park bigFM Expedition GeForce Official Page (English)
 Detailed Review (English)

Roller coasters in Germany
Roller coasters introduced in 2001